Jamie Smart (born 21 July 1978) is a British comic artist and author best known for his 10-issue comic series Bear.

The Phoenix 
He is known for his children's cartoon series Bunny VS. Monkey, running in The Phoenix, created originally by Smart for a TV show. Other strips he has worked on at The Phoenix include Megalomaniacs, Battlesuit Bea and Looshkin.

The Dandy
He was instrumental in the design of the October 2010 revamp of The Dandy and designing the new logos. For the revamp, Smart drew Desperate Dan, Pre-Skool Prime Minister, Arena of Awesome, My Dad's a Doofus (as well as many others) with reprints of My Own Genie and Space Raoul later being used.
His blue blobs have been part of The Dandy cover since October 2010 and appeared in The Digital Dandy during its run.

For the final print edition of The Dandy on its 75th anniversary, Jamie Smart drew the special cover as well as drawing My Own Genie, My Dad's a Doofus, Pre-Skool Prime Minister and My Teacher's a Walrus in the Top 75 Countdown. A reprint from The Arena of Awesome was also used.

Other comics
Smart drew The Numskulls and Kingo Bango for the relaunched Digital Dandy until its demise. Smart also appeared regularly in The Beano drawing puzzle pages and took over drawing Roger the Dodger from Barrie Appleby, which as of April 2014, he no longer draws. He also drew a new strip for the comic called El Poco Loco in 2013.

Self-published comics include Moose Kid Comics, a free online all-ages anthology.

In October 2019, Smart's first illustrated novel, Flember: The Secret Book was released by David Fickling Books, which had previously published his collections of "Bunny VS Monkey" and "Looshkin". This was followed by the release of Flember: The Crystal Caves and Flember: The Glowing Skull

List of published comics
 Space Raoul ~ Funday Times/The Dandy
 Bear ~ Slave Labour Graphics
 Bohda Te ~ Slave Labour Graphics
 Ubu Bubu ~ Slave Labour Graphics
 Desperate Dan ~ The Dandy
 The DFC Olympics ~ The DFC
 Fish-Head Steve ~ The DFC
 Count Von Poo ~ Toxic magazine
 Pre-Skool Prime Minister ~ The Dandy
 The Arena of Awesome ~ The Dandy
 Thingummyblob ~ The Dandy
 Bunny VS. Monkey ~ The Phoenix
 Mega-Lo-Maniacs ~ The Phoenix
 My Dad's A Doofus ~ The Dandy
 My Teacher's a Walrus ~ The Dandy
 The Numskulls ~ The Digital Dandy
 Kingo Bango ~ The Digital Dandy
 Roger the Dodger ~ The Beano
 El Poco Loco ~ The Beano
 Corporate Skull ~ Webcomic
 Looshkin - (2018)The Phoenix 
 Battlesuit Bea - The Phoenix
 Find Chaffy - (2011)

List of published novels

Flember series
 The Secret Book (3 Oct 2019) 
 The Crystal Caves (1 Oct 2020)

References

External links
 Jamie Smart's Livejournal
 Bohda Te
 Fumboo (online portfolio)
 Flember development blog
 Interview, DACS

Living people
1978 births
British comics writers
British comics artists
Slave Labor Graphics
The Dandy people
The Beano people